Cochranella vozmedianoi (in Spanish: ranita de cristal de Paria) is a species of frog in the family Centrolenidae, endemic to the Cerro El Humo, in the Paria Peninsula in northern Venezuela.

Description
Males measure  in snout–vent length and have shagreen dorsal skin with low warts. Snout is truncate.

Habitat and conservation
Its natural habitat is tropical humid forest at  asl. It occurs along streams. Eggs are laid on the upper sides of leaves overhanging streams. Its conservation status is uncertain, although habitat loss from agricultural development and the clearance of vegetation overhanging streams is a threat.

References

Celsiella
Amphibians of Venezuela
Endemic fauna of Venezuela
Taxa named by Josefa Celsa Señaris
Amphibians described in 1997
Taxonomy articles created by Polbot
Taxa named by José Ayarzagüena